is a Japanese comedian, actress, and fashion designer. She rose to fame in 2008 for her imitation of Beyoncé, after which she was given the title “the Japanese Beyoncé”.

Career
Watanabe does impersonations of popular artists in Japanese culture, among which her imitation of Beyoncé singing "Dreamgirls" and "Crazy in Love" quickly became popular. She has also launched her own fashion line called Punyus (loosely translated to "chubby" in English), and played the role of Mabel in the musical Fame and Tracy Turnblad in the musical Hairspray. Her Instagram account has 9.9 million followers as of February 23, 2023.

Guest appearances
Watanabe was seen as a guest in the 2013 anime movie Crayon Shin-chan: Very Tasty! B-class Gourmet Survival!!. In 2016, she voiced the character of Ashima in the Japanese language dub of the Thomas & Friends film The Great Race. In 2019, she was featured in Queer Eye: We're in Japan!, Season 1, Episode 3, The Ideal Woman.

In March 2021 she announced her intention to move from Japan to the United States the next month. She has appeared in Us Weekly magazine.

Personal life
Watanabe was born in Taipei to a Japanese father and a Taiwanese mother and raised in Ibaraki: She is of Japanese and Taiwanese descent.

Discography

Singles

As a featured artist

Filmography

Variety shows

Film

Television drama

Animation

Japanese dub
Live-action

Animation

Notes

References

External links
 Naomi Watanabe's profile at Yoshimoto Kogyo
 Punyus (fashion brand)
 

1987 births
Living people
Japanese film actresses
Japanese musical theatre actresses
Japanese television actresses
Japanese voice actresses
Japanese women comedians
Japanese fashion designers
Japanese people of Taiwanese descent
Japanese women fashion designers
21st-century comedians
21st-century Japanese actresses